Kyle Abeysinghe (born 4 February 2000) is a Sri Lankan national swimmer who has represented his country at several international competitions. At the domestic level, Abeysinghe holds numerous national records, has been national champion several times, and is a member of the Killer Whale Aquatic Club, under his coach and father, Manoj Abeysinghe. At the 2017 Youth Commonwealth Games in Nassau, Bahamas, Abeysinghe won two silver medals in the 50m and the 100m Freetyle, becoming the only Sri Lankan in swimming to achieve this feat.

Career

His first time representing Sri Lanka was at the FINA Youth Programme in Doha, Qatar in 2014. Since then he has represented Sri Lanka at the 2015 Junior World Swimming Championships held in Singapore, the 2016 South Asian Games held in Guwahati, India, where he won 4 medals; one gold, two silvers, and one bronze. Subsequently, he competed in the 2016 South Asian Aquatic Championships held in Colombo, Sri Lanka and the 2016 World Swimming Championships held in Windsor, Canada. At the 2016 South Asian Aquatic Championships he won 4 gold medals and 1 silver medal in his individual events. 
In addition, he helped Sri Lanka secure three gold medals and two silver medals in all five relays, bringing his medal tally to seven gold and three silver, tying his brother Matthew for most medals won.   In Windsor, Abeysinghe broke two national records in the 200-meter Individual Medley (IM) and the 200-meter Freestyle. The 200m IM record was previously held by the 2012 London Olympian Heshan Unamboowe and the 200m Freestyle record was held by his elder brother, Olympian, Matthew Abeysinghe. The next year, at the 2017 Commonwealth Youth Games in Nassau, Bahamas, Abeysinghe achieved unprecedented levels of success for Sri Lanka, winning two silver medals in the 50m and 100m Freestyle events. He became one of very few Sri Lankan athletes, and the only swimmer, to ever medal at a Commonwealth Games event. Just a few months later, Abeysinghe competed at the 2017 FINA World Junior Swimming Championships. In early 2018, Abeysinghe competed at the 2018 Commonwealth Games in Gold Coast, Australia. There, he was part of the 4x100 Freestyle Relay, the first Sri Lankan swimming relay team to ever make the final at the Commonwealth Games. Later on that year, during the 2018 Asian Games in Jakarta, Indonesia, Abeysinghe swam the second-fastest 100m Freestyle by a Sri Lankan, behind only his elder brother, Matthew. After that, Abeysinghe was set to compete at the 2018 Summer Youth Olympics in Argentina, preparing for another run at medal contention. Due to medical reasons, he was unable to compete and in his stead, teammate Akalanka Pieris attended. In December 2018, Abeysinghe competed at the 2018 FINA World Swimming Championships (25 m) in Hangzhou, China.

2014 Fina Youth Programme
Abeysinghe was one of two swimmers chosen to represent Sri Lanka at the Fina Youth Programme in Doha, Qatar.

2015 Junior World Championships
Abeysinghe was chosen to represent Sri Lanka at the Junior World Championships held in Singapore. He swam the 50,100 and 200-meter Freestyle events along with the 200 Individual Medley.

2016 South Asian Games
In December 2015 Abeysinghe was named to the large contingent of swimmers chosen to represent Sri Lanka at the South Asian Games in Guwahati, India in February 2016. Abeysinghe was part of the 4x100m Freestyle relay that made history by winning the event, beating India, after 25 years. He also got two silver medals in the 4x200m freestyle relay and the 4x100m medley relay and a bronze medal in his only individual event, the 400m Freestyle.

2016 South Asian Aquatic Championships
Abeysinghe won 7 Gold medals and 3 silver medals. His highest tally of medals at any international competition.

2016 World Championships
Following his exceptional performance at SAAC he was chosen to represent Sri Lanka at the World Championships held in Windsor, Canada. In Windsor, Abeysinghe broke two national records in the 200m Freestyle and 200m IM, one belonging to his older brother Matthew and the other to Heshan Unamboowe.

2017 Commonwealth Youth Games
In July 2017 Abeysinghe was named to Sri Lanka's 2017 Commonwealth Youth Games team. During the competition Abeysinghe won two silver medals in the men's 100m and the 50m freestyle events, marking Sri Lanka's first ever swimming medal at either the Youth or Senior Commonwealth Games.

2017 Junior World Championships
Following his incredible performance at Youth Commonwealth Games, Abeysinghe was chosen to the Sri Lankan national team for the Junior World Championships in Indianapolis, USA.

2018 Commonwealth Games
In February 2018, Abeysinghe was named to Sri Lanka's 2018 Commonwealth Games team. Although Abeysinghe was injured at the competition he helped make Sri Lankan swimming history in the 4x100m Freestyle relay by qualifying for the first-ever final at a Commonwealth Games. Unfortunately, they were disqualified for an early start in the final by the anchor leg.

2018 Asian Games
Kyle was named to the 2018 Asian Games team in July of the same year after winning 3 events at the Asian Games Trial held at Sugathadasa Stadium. At the Asian Games, his times of 23.36 and 50.14 in the 50m and 100m Freestyle events respectively, were the second-fastest times in Sri Lankan history behind only his elder brother Matthew Abeysinghe.

Personal life
Kyle Abeysinghe lives in Colombo, Sri Lanka. He attended Wycherley International School. He trains under swim coach and father, Manoj Abeysinghe, at the Killer Whale Aquatic Club (KWA), the winningest club in Sri Lanka. His family is well known for their swimming prowess in the sporting community of Sri Lanka. He has four elder brothers, all of whom are swimmers. His eldest brother, Andrew Abeysinghe, is a former national champion, national record holder, and multiple South Asian Games gold medalist. Matthew Abeysinghe, his second eldest brother, is the most decorated athlete in South Asian Games history, having broken the record for most gold medals won at a single SAG, twice. He is also an Olympian, former national champion, national record holder, and South Asian record holder. Dillon Abeysinghe, his third eldest brother, is a former national champion, national record holder, and South Asian Aquatic Championship medalist. Their father, Manoj Abeysinghe, is considered one of the greatest coaches in Sri Lankan swimming, producing numerous international medalists, national record holders, and national champions. Since its inception in 2010 and, under his guidance, Killer Whale Aquatics has won the most national championships, in both SCM and LCM.

Together, he and his three brothers hold a national record in the 4x50 Medley Relay.

References

Living people
2000 births
People from Hazleton, Pennsylvania
Sri Lankan male swimmers
Swimmers at the 2018 Commonwealth Games
Swimmers at the 2018 Asian Games
Commonwealth Games competitors for Sri Lanka
South Asian Games gold medalists for Sri Lanka
South Asian Games silver medalists for Sri Lanka
South Asian Games bronze medalists for Sri Lanka
Asian Games competitors for Sri Lanka
South Asian Games medalists in swimming
21st-century Sri Lankan people